The Libyan Sea (Greek , Latin Libycum Mare, Arabic البحر الليبي) is the portion of the Mediterranean Sea north of the African coast of ancient Libya, i.e. Cyrenaica, and Marmarica
(the coast of what is now eastern Libya and western Egypt, between Tobruk and Alexandria). This designation was used by ancient geographers describing the southern Mediterranean, but the term is also used by modern travel writers and cartographers. The southern coastline of Crete which borders the Libyan Sea includes the Asterousia Mountains and Mesara Plain; this area is the locus of considerable ancient Bronze Age settlement including the sites of Kommos, Hagia Triada and Phaistos. 

Not counting Crete, other islands in the Libyan Sea are Gavdos, Gavdopoula, Koufonisi, and Chrysi.

To the east is the Levantine Sea, to the north the Ionian Sea, and to the west the Strait of Sicily.

See also
Asterousia Mountains
Gulf of Sidra

References

Seas of the Mediterranean Sea

Marginal seas of the Mediterranean